Haplochrois gelechiella is a species of moth of the family Elachistidae. It is found in Greece.

The wingspan is 12–14 mm. Adults have been recorded in July.

The food plant is unknown.

References

External links
Lepiforum e. V.

Moths described in 1902
Elachistidae
Moths of Europe